Steinbach may refer to:

Businesses
 Steinbach (store), a defunct American department store chain in Asbury Park, New Jersey
 Steinbach Credit Union, a Canadian credit union in Manitoba
 Worthmann & Steinbach, a defunct American architectural firm in Chicago

Name
 Steinbach (surname), a German surname

Places

Austria
 Steinbach am Attersee, in the district of Vöcklabruck
 Steinbach am Ziehberg, in the district of Kirchdorf an der Krems
 Steinbach an der Steyr, in the district of Kirchdorf an der Krems

Belgium
 Steinbach, Gouvy, a village in the municipality of Gouvy

Canada
 Steinbach, Manitoba, a city in southeastern Manitoba and largest community with this name
Steinbach (electoral district), a provincial riding encompassing the city of Steinbach and surrounding area

France
 Steinbach, Haut-Rhin, a commune in the Haut-Rhin département

Germany
 , a locality of Baden-Baden, Baden-Württemberg
 Steinbach, Eichsfeld, a town in the district of Eichsfeld, Thuringia
 Steinbach (Fürstenfeldbruck), a locality of Moorenweis, Bavaria
 Steinbach-Hallenberg, a town in Thuringia
 , a locality of Johannesberg, Bavaria
 Steinbach (Külsheim), a locality of Külsheim, Baden-Württemberg
 Steinbach, Rhein-Hunsrück in the Rhein-Hunsrück district, Rhineland-Palatinate 
 Steinbach (Taunus), in Hesse
 Steinbach, Wartburgkreis, a town in Thuringia
 Steinbach am Donnersberg in the Donnersbergkreis, Rhineland-Palatinate 
 Steinbach am Glan in the district of Kusel, Rhineland-Palatinate
 Steinbach am Wald, a town in the district of Kronach in Bavaria
 Steinbach, part of the City of Lebach in Saarland

Rivers of Germany
Steinbach (Sassnitz), of Mecklenburg-Vorpommern, in Sassnitz
Steinbach (Vilicher Bach), of North Rhine-Westphalia, in the district Beuel of Bonn
Steinbach (Laerbach), of Lower Saxony and of North Rhine-Westphalia, tributary of the Laerbach
Steinbach (Bühler), of Baden-Württemberg, tributary of the Bühler
Steinbach (Jagst), of Baden-Württemberg, tributary of the Jagst
Steinbach (Gersprenz), of Hesse, tributary of the Gersprenz
Steinbach (Nidda), of Hesse, tributary of the Nidda
Steinbach (Hafenlohr), of Bavaria, tributary of the Hafenlohr
Steinbach (Kahl), of Bavaria, tributary of the Kahl
Steinbach (Main), of Bavaria, tributary of the Main
Steinbach (Paar), of Bavaria, tributary of the Paar
Steinbach (Reichenbach), of Bavaria, tributary of the Reichenbach
Steinbach (Saalach), of Bavaria and Austria, tributary of the Saalach

Schools
 In Steinbach, Manitoba, Canada:
 Steinbach Bible College, an Anabaptist college
 Steinbach Christian School, an independent day school
 Steinbach Regional Secondary School

Sports
 TSV Steinbach, from Steinbach, near Haiger, Germany
 Steinbach Black Wings 1992, from Linz, Austria
 Sports teams based in Steinbach, Manitoba, Canada
 Steinbach Hawks
 Steinbach Huskies
 Steinbach North Stars
 Steinbach Pistons